Ifira is an offshore island of efate located in Shefa Province of Vanuatu in the Pacific Ocean.

Geography
Ifira lies off the coast of Efate Island in Vila harbour. There is newly completed Lapetasi International Container Terminal on the island.

Population
As of 2015, the official local population was 721 people in 146 households. Local people speak Mele-Ifira language (or Ifira-Mele) which is a Polynesian language also spoken in Mele and Efate.

References

Islands of Vanuatu
Shefa Province